FotoKem is a film laboratory and post-production studio located in Burbank, California. The company was founded in 1963.

Services include telecine from 16mm, 35mm and 65mm to standard definition or high definition; high-resolution scans; film scanning and recording; DVD-creation; editing; digital intermediates, optical track creation; nonlinear finishing; titling, video duplication and standards conversion; global data delivery; encoding; and other services related to the completion of a motion picture feature, television series, commercial, or other professional film production.

In 2019, FotoKem expanded its creative post-production  services in Santa Monica. FotoKem Santa Monica is linked to the company's Burbank and Hollywood locations via a secure fiber network, ensuring that feature-film and episodic finishing work can take place in real-time among all locations.

See also
 Spirit DataCine
 Post-production
 History of film
 Studio zone

References

External links 
 

Business services companies established in 1963
Television and film post-production companies
Buildings and structures in Burbank, California
1963 establishments in California